Danilov Lug is a rural locality (a settlement) in Krasnovishersky District, Perm Krai, Russia. The population was 228 as of 2010. There are 5 streets.

Geography 
Danilov Lug is located 36 km southwest of Krasnovishersk (the district's administrative centre) by road. Ust-Yazva is the nearest rural locality.

References 

Rural localities in Krasnovishersky District